A list of people, who died during the 10th century, who have received recognition as Blessed (through beatification) or Saint (through canonization) from the Catholic Church:

Timeline

See also 

Christianity in the 10th century
List of Anglo-Saxon saints

10
10
Saint